The fourth season of The Voice Kids, premiered on Rede Globo on January 6, 2019 in the 2:00 / 1:00 p.m. (BRST / AMT) daytime slot.

On April 14, 2019, Jeremias Reis from Team Simone & Simaria won the competition with 58.19% of the final vote over Luiza Barbosa (Team Claudia) and Raylla Araújo (Team Brown). This also makes Simone & Simaria the first female coaches to win more than one season, and the first female coaches to win back-to-back seasons.

Teams
 Key

Blind auditions
Key

Episode 1 (Jan. 6)

Episode 2 (Jan. 13)

Episode 3 (Jan. 20)

Episode 4 (Jan. 27)

Episode 5 (Feb. 3)

Episode 6 (Feb. 10)

The Battles
Key

Live shows

Elimination chart

Artist's info

	

Result details

Week 1

Showdown 1

Week 2

Showdown 2

Week 3

Quarterfinals

Week 4

Semifinals

Week 5

Finals

Ratings and reception

Brazilian ratings
All numbers are in points and provided by Kantar Ibope Media.

References

External links
Official website on Gshow.com

Kids 4
2019 Brazilian television seasons